Strane is a small village below the eastern slopes of Mount Nanos in the Municipality of Postojna in the Inner Carniola region of Slovenia.

Yew

Strane has what is considered the oldest and largest yew in Slovenia. Karel Dežman had previously estimated the tree as 952 years old in 1860, assuming a slower rate of growth. Folk tradition claims that Saint Jerome preached under a predecessor of the current yew.

A second, younger yew stands near the older one. The younger yew is unusual in that it is monoecious, the only known example of such a yew in Slovenia.

Church

The local church in the settlement is dedicated to the Holy Cross and belongs to the Parish of Ubeljsko.

References

External links

Strane on Geopedia

Populated places in the Municipality of Postojna